John O'Donnell (born 13 November 1985) is a London-based Irish Traveller professional boxer who is a former holder of the Commonwealth welterweight championship.

Professional boxing career

Early professional career
O'Donnell, had his first professional in April 2004 with a win over journeyman Jason Nesbitt at the Penningtons Nightclub in Bradford.  Over the next three years he would fight 13 more times without defeat against a series of journeymen opponents before earning the right to fight for the English title in May 2007. His opponent for the vacant English belt was fellow unbeaten prospect Stuart Elwell.  The fight ended with a 10 round points victory for O'Donnell.  Following his win over Elwell, O'Donnell next travelled to Las Vegas in May 2007 to fight Mexican Christian Solano on the undercard of Floyd Mayweather's fight with Oscar De La Hoya.  The bout ended with disappointment for the 15-0 prospect after the fight was stopped in the 2nd round giving victory to the Mexican.  Such was the devastating nature of the defeat, O'Donnell took a year off from boxing and only returned in May 2008 with a win over journeyman Billy Smith. Four more victories followed in 2008 before being given the chance to fight for the Commonwealth title in 2009.

Commonwealth champion
O'Donnell's shot at a first major title came on 11 April 2009.  In the opposite corner, the champion Craig Watson, had himself claimed the title with a win over Namibian Ali Nuumbembe and made one defence against Matthew Hatton, the brother of Ricky. It was a step up in class for O'Donnell and he signaled his entry into the top tier of domestic boxing with victory over Watson via a split decision in what was described as a close and scintillating contest.  O'Donnell had been due to make the first defence of his newly won title on 5 September 2009 but due to problems making the weight had to settle for a non-title contest over 12 rounds against Tom Glover.  The fight, shown live on ITV4, was too much of a step-up for Glover who was stopped in the 6th round with O'Donnell having taken full control.  O'Donnell gave up the belt after coming under pressure from the Commonwealth council after a mandatory defence scheduled for 5 March 2010 against the Ghanaian boxer Philip Kotey fell through. On 7 May 2010 he stepped back into the ring to defeat Hungarian boxer Laszlo Balogh in the 5th round of an 8 round contest stating after the fight that he would like to meet Paul McCloskey in an all Irish contest for the European title.  On 10 September 2010 O'Donnell fought the American former Olympic bronze medal winner Terrance Cauthen in an international contest at the York Hall.  Winning the fight over 12 rounds O'Donnell claimed that Cauthen was the best boxer he had ever faced and that the reason why he gave up his Commonwealth belt was "because my team did not want that belt to hold me back, so I could go onto the next level".

British title challenge
On 19 February 2011 O'Donnell met former victim Craig Watson at the Wembley Arena to challenge for the vacant British title only for Watson to gain revenge by winning over 12 rounds.

Professional record

|- style="margin:0.5em auto; font-size:95%;"
|align="center" colspan=8|32 Wins (11 knockouts, 21 decisions), 2 Losses (1 knockout, 1 decision)|- style="margin:0.5em auto; font-size:95%;"
|align=center style="border-style: none none solid solid; background: #e3e3e3"|Res.|align=center style="border-style: none none solid solid; background: #e3e3e3"|Record|align=center style="border-style: none none solid solid; background: #e3e3e3"|Opponent|align=center style="border-style: none none solid solid; background: #e3e3e3"|Type|align=center style="border-style: none none solid solid; background: #e3e3e3"|Rd., Time|align=center style="border-style: none none solid solid; background: #e3e3e3"|Date|align=center style="border-style: none none solid solid; background: #e3e3e3"|Location|align=center style="border-style: none none solid solid; background: #e3e3e3"|Notes'''
|-align=center
|-align=center
|Win|| 32-2 ||align=left| Erick Ochieng
|||  ||   || align=left|  
|align=left|
|-align=center
|-align=center
|Win|| 31-2 ||align=left| Tommy Tear
|||  ||   || align=left|  
|align=left|
|-align=center
|Win|| 30-2 ||align=left| Jan Balog
|||  ||   || align=left|  
|align=left|
|-align=center
|Win|| 29-2 ||align=left| Laszlo Fazekas
|||  ||   || align=left|  
|align=left|
|-align=center
|Win|| 28-2 ||align=left| Jay Morris
|||  ||   || align=left|  
|align=left|
|-align=center
|Win|| 27-2 ||align=left| Stephen Haughian
|||  ||   || align=left|  
|align=left|
|-align=center
|Win|| 26-2 ||align=left| Thomas Mendez
|||  ||   || align=left|  
|align=left|
|-align=center
|Win|| 25-2 ||align=left| Martin Welsh
|||  ||   || align=left|  
|align=left|
|-align=center
|Loss|| 24-2 ||align=left| Craig Watson
|||  ||   || align=left|  
|align=left|
|-align=center
|Win|| 24-1 ||align=left| Terrance Cauthen
|||  ||   || align=left|  
|align=left|
|-align=center
|Win|| 23-1 ||align=left| Laszlo Robert Balogh
|||  ||   || align=left|  
|align=left|
|-align=center
|Win|| 22-1 ||align=left| Tom Glover
|||  ||   || align=left|  
|align=left|
|-align=center
|Win|| 21-1 ||align=left| Craig Watson
|||  ||   || align=left|  
|align=left|
|-align=center
|Win|| 20-1 ||align=left| Suleyman Dag
|||  ||   || align=left|  
|align=left|
|-align=center
|Win|| 19-1 ||align=left| Sergejs Sayrinovics
|||  ||   || align=left|  
|align=left|
|-align=center
|Win|| 18-1 ||align=left| Sergejs Volodins
|||  ||   || align=left|  
|align=left|
|-align=center
|Win|| 17-1 ||align=left| Jay Morris
|||  ||   || align=left|  
|align=left|
|-align=center
|Win|| 16-1 ||align=left| Billy Smith
|||  ||   || align=left|  
|align=left|
|-align=center
|Loss|| 15-1 ||align=left| Christian Solano
|||  ||   || align=left|  
|align=left|
|-align=center
|Win|| 15-0 ||align=left| Stuart Elwell
|||  ||   || align=left|  
|align=left|
|-align=center
|Win|| 14-0 ||align=left| Ernie Smith
|||  ||   || align=left|  
|align=left|
|-align=center
|Win|| 13-0 ||align=left| Silence Saheed
|||  ||   || align=left|  
|align=left|
|-align=center
|Win|| 12-0 ||align=left| Darren Gethin
|||  ||   || align=left|  
|align=left|
|-align=center
|Win|| 11-0 ||align=left| Duncan Cottier
|||  ||   || align=left|  
|align=left|
|-align=center
|Win|| 10-0 ||align=left| Karl Taylor
|||  ||   || align=left|  
|align=left|
|-align=center
|Win|| 9-0 ||align=left| Zaid Bediouri 
|||  ||   || align=left|  
|align=left|
|-align=center
|Win|| 8-0 ||align=left| Matt Scriven 
|||  ||   || align=left|  
|align=left|
|-align=center
|Win|| 7-0 ||align=left| Ben Hudson
|||  ||   || align=left|  
|align=left|
|-align=center
|Win|| 6-0 ||align=left| Ben Hudson
|||  ||   || align=left|  
|align=left|
|-align=center
|Win|| 5-0 ||align=left| Duncan Cottier
|||  ||   || align=left|  
|align=left|
|-align=center
|Win|| 4-0 ||align=left| Ernie Smith
|||  ||   || align=left|  
|align=left|
|-align=center
|Win|| 3-0 ||align=left| Chris Long
|||  ||   || align=left|  
|align=left|
|-align=center
|Win|| 2-0 ||align=left| Dave Hinds
|||  ||   || align=left|  
|align=left|
|-align=center
|Win|| 1-0 ||align=left| Jason Nesbitt
|||  ||   || align=left|  
|align=left|

References

External links

 
 

1985 births
20th-century Irish people
21st-century Irish people
Living people
People from County Galway
English male boxers
Sportspeople from County Galway
Irish male boxers
Welterweight boxers
Irish Traveller sportspeople 
Irish Travellers